If You Were Here may refer to:

"If You Were Here" (Kent song), a song by Kent
"If You Were Here", a song by Poe from Haunted
"If You Were Here" (Thompson Twins song)
"If You Were Here Tonight", a song by Alexander O'Neal